Mo is a village in Surnadal Municipality in Møre og Romsdal county, Norway. The small village is home to Mo Church, the oldest church in the municipality. There is also a pre-school located in Mo.

References

Surnadal
Villages in Møre og Romsdal